The 4th New York Provisional Cavalry was a cavalry regiment that served in the Union Army at the end of the  American Civil War.

Service
Under special orders of the War Department, dated May 8, 1865, this organization was formed by the consolidation of the 3rd Cavalry and the 1st Mounted Rifles; the consolidation took place July 21, 1865, and September 6, 1865, and the new regiment was designated as above.

The companies were formed from the 1st Mounted Rifles and the 3d Cavalry, and Col. Edwin V. Sumner, of the 1st Mounted Rifles, was placed in command of the regiment, which was honorably discharged and mustered out, under his command, November 29, 1865, at City Point, Virginia, having lost by death, of disease and other causes, ten enlisted men.

See also
List of New York Civil War regiments

Notes

References
The Civil War Archive
New York State Military Museum and Veterans Research Center - 4th Provisional Regiment of Cavalry – Civil War

Cavalry 004
1865 establishments in New York (state)
Military units and formations established in 1865
Military units and formations disestablished in 1865